The following is a list of music podcasts.

List

See also 

 Music
 Music radio
 Popular music
 List of popular music genres

References

External links 
 Music podcasts on NPR
 Music podcasts on iHeartRadio
 Music podcasts on Spotify

Music-related lists
Music